In mathematics, Chebyshev's sum inequality, named after Pafnuty Chebyshev, states that if
 and 
then

Similarly, if
 and 
then

Proof
Consider the sum

The two sequences are non-increasing, therefore  and  have the same sign for any . Hence .

Opening the brackets, we deduce:

hence

An alternative proof is simply obtained with the rearrangement inequality, writing that

Continuous version
There is also a continuous version of Chebyshev's sum inequality:

If f and g are real-valued, integrable functions over [a, b], both non-increasing or both non-decreasing, then

with the inequality reversed if one is non-increasing and the other is non-decreasing.

See also
 Hardy–Littlewood inequality
 Rearrangement inequality

Notes

Inequalities
Sequences and series